Mänttäri is a Finnish surname. Notable people with the surname include:

Aune Mänttäri (born 1936), Finnish politician
Ulla Mänttäri, Finnish orienteer

See also
Justa Holz-Mänttäri (born 1936), Finnish translation scholar

Finnish-language surnames